, lit. Student Double Suicide a.k.a.

Cast 
 Isao Kimura
 
 Keishichi Nakahara (中原啓七)
 Junkichi Orimoto
 Yoshifumi Tajima
 Nobuo Kawakami (河上信夫)
 Keiju Kobayashi
 Jukichi Uno
 Sachiko Tōyama (遠山幸子) 
 Keiji Itami (伊丹慶治)
 Akiko Kōno (高野明子)
 Kahoru Yamamoto (山本かほる)
 Nobuo Kaneko
 Sumiko Minami (南寿美子)
 Emiko Yanagi (柳恵美子)
 
 
 Minako Gomi (五味三奈子)
 Chieko Yamashita (山下千枝子)
 Reiko Kita (北玲子)
 Nobuteru Hanamura (花村信輝)
 Zenji Yamada (山田禅二)
 Tagayasu Kihara (紀原耕)
 Miki Ejima (絵島美紀)
 Reiko Kuba (久場礼子)

References

External links 
 Official Nikkatsu site
 at allcinema.net

Japanese black-and-white films
1954 films
Nikkatsu films
1950s Japanese films